KTSD may refer to:

 KTSD-FM, a radio station (91.1 FM) licensed to Reliance, South Dakota, United States
 KTSD-TV, a television station (channel 10 analog/21 digital) licensed to Pierre, South Dakota, United States